Anthony J. Lisska was Maria Theresa Barney professor of philosophy at Denison University. He was a specialist in Thomism and analytic philosophy and the thinking of St. Thomas Aquinas. He described his "intellectual avocation" as regional history and wrote several books on the history of Ohio. In 2016, the Denison University Gilpatrick Center was rededicated as the Lisska Center for Scholarly Engagement in honor of Anthony Lisska and his contributions to the university. These contributions include serving as dean, chairing the philosophy department, and founding and chairing the Honors Program.

Lisska earned a Bachelor of Arts from Providence College, a master’s from Saint Stephen's College, a doctorate from The Ohio State University, and a certificate from the Institute for Educational Management at Harvard University.

Lisska passed away on September 18, 2022 at 84 years of age.

Selected publications
Philosophy matters. Charles Merrill, 1978.
Aquinas theory of natural law: An analytic reconstruction. Oxford University Press, Oxford, 1996.
A history of Aquinas College High School
An illustrated history of the Buckeye Lake Yacht Club. 2007.

See also
Henry Babcock Veatch

References 

Denison University faculty
Providence College alumni
Ohio State University alumni
American philosophy academics
American historians
History of Ohio
Local historians
New Blackfriars people
Analytical Thomists